Oleksandr Volodymyrovych Shovkovskyi (born 2 January 1975) is a Ukrainian former professional footballer who played as a goalkeeper. He played for Dynamo Kyiv in the Ukrainian Premier League, the top level of Ukrainian football, from 1993 to 2016. In the 2020 Kyiv local election, Shovkovskyi was elected into the Kyiv City Council, as candidate of UDAR (the party of incumbent Kyiv Mayor Vitaliy Klychko).

Club career
Born in Kyiv, Ukraine, Shovkovskyi is a graduate of the Dynamo Kyiv football academy. Since his teenage years and up until now he has played for only one club. In fact he has more caps for the club than anybody else in the history of Dynamo. After advancing from one age group youth team to another, the talented young goalkeeper made his way to the first squad of the Ukrainian giants Dynamo where he made his debut in a league fixture in 1993. By next year he was already called up to the Ukraine national football team. Throughout the majority of his career he was the first choice goalkeeper for Dynamo, except for a few brief periods caused by injuries. The goalkeeper's fame came to him as he became notorious for saving penalties, which made him popular in the media and among fans. By the end of 2009 his goals against average in the League was .632 with over 300 games played.

In the summer of 2011, Shovkovskyi played his 100th match in the Champions League (against Rubin Kazan in Kazan). Shovkovskyi has played 121 matches in European cups, keeping 33 clean-sheets; 109 of these appearances have come in the UEFA Champions League (77, excluding qualifiers), in which he has kept 28 clean sheets (16, excluding qualifiers).

On 13 December 2016, Shovkovskyi announced his retirement at the age of 41.

International career
Shovkovskyi is well known for his blunder during the UEFA Euro 2000 play-off game where the Ukraine national team faced Slovenia. In the 83rd minute of the first leg in Ljubljana, Shovkovskyi came out of his goal almost to the corner flag to kick the ball away, but scuffed his kick to Milenko Ačimovič who scored into the empty net from 40 meters out. Ukraine lost this match 2–1 and drew the second leg 1–1 and hence did not qualify for Euro 2000 in Netherlands/Belgium.

Shovkovskyi was the first-choice keeper for Ukraine at the 2006 FIFA World Cup. Notably, he saved two spot kicks from Marco Streller and Ricardo Cabanas in the penalty shootout against Switzerland in their second-round match, which sent Ukraine through to the quarterfinals, becoming the first goalkeeper in FIFA World Cup history not to concede a goal during penalty shootout (Tranquillo Barnetta also hit the bar); Shovkovskyi was subsequently awarded the man of the match award. Also more recently Oleksandr was voted player of the tournament in early 2008, in a Channel One Cup in Israel, which was won by Dynamo in a notorious game against the club's top rival Shakhtar Donetsk. During this game in a series of penalty kicks, Oleksandr Shovkovskyi saved 3 kicks and almost single-handedly won the match. His goals against average for the national team is .86 with a bit short of 100 games mark on his count (92).

In September 2012, Shovkovskyi announced his retirement from the Ukraine national team.

Until 2013 Shovkovskyi held the record for the Ukraine national team of minutes played without a goal, 728 minutes, but it was beaten by Andriy Pyatov.

Four years after his retirement from the game, Shovkovskyi, as an assistant to national team coach Andriy Shevchenko and aged 45, was listed as a back-up goalkeeper for Ukraine for a friendly match away to France on 7 October 2020 after three of the four goalkeepers in the squad tested positive for COVID-19.

Political views and career
Shovkovskyi got a lot of media attention when giving an interview about the Euromaidan situation. When commenting on the number of people killed, he mentioned how his grandfather started every toast saying "For not having any wars", after which he couldn't hold his tears. Before a Europa League game against Valencia, Shovkovskyi sent a request to UEFA to start the games of the Ukrainian clubs from a moment of silence, a request that was granted.

Shovkovskyi is a supporter of the Euromaidan movement, and said he wants to live by "European values and not by Soviet values". He also criticized the previous government for the use of violence against the protesters. However, he criticized the decision of the new government to take away the status of Russian language as a second language in Russian language speaking regions.

Shovkovskyi was a Kyiv City Council candidate of UDAR (the party of incumbent Kyiv Mayor Vitaliy Klychko) in the 2020 Kyiv local election set for 25 October 2020. He was elected, together with 29 other representatives of his party.

In January 2023, he left his post as assistant coach of Ukraine national team, which he held since 2018.

Career statistics

Club

International

Honours
Dynamo Kyiv
Ukrainian Premier League (14): 1993–94, 1994–95, 1995–96, 1996–97, 1997–98, 1998–99, 1999–2000, 2000–01, 2002–03, 2003–04, 2006–07, 2008–09, 2014–15, 2015–16
Ukrainian Cup (10): 1995–96, 1997–98, 1998–99, 1999–2000, 2002–03, 2004–05, 2005–06, 2006–07, 2013–14, 2014–15
Ukrainian Super Cup (6): 2004, 2006, 2007, 2009, 2011, 2016
CIS Cup: 1996, 1997, 1998, 2002
Valeriy Lobanovskyi Memorial Tournament: 2003, 2004

Individual
Ukrainian Footballer of the Year: 2nd place 2004–05 (by newspaper «Komanda»)
Ukrainian goalkeeper of the Year (9): 1994, 1997–1999, 2003–2006, 2011 (by newspaper «Ukrayinskyi futbol»)
UPL goalkeeper of the season: 2010–11, 2011–12
independent Ukraine's history the best footballer, with Andriy Shevchenko and Anatoliy Tymoshchuk)
2000–2010 CIS the best goalkeeper (by soccer.ru)
Ukrainian Footballer of the Year: 2nd place (1994), 3rd place (1999) (by newspaper «Ukrayinskyi futbol»)
1999 European Goalkeeper of the Year – 2nd place (Based on Ballon d'Or Ranking) 
2006 FIFA World Cup round of 16 Switzerland vs Ukraine Man of the Match
Shovkovskyi's save in match Rubin Kazan vs. Dynamo Kyiv – 2009–10 UEFA Champions League group stage fifth round Moment of the Round
2010–11 UEFA Europa League best goalkeeper

References

External links

Oleksandr Shovkovskyi Profile at FC Dynamo Kyiv

 

1975 births
Living people
Footballers from Kyiv
Ukrainian footballers
Ukraine under-21 international footballers
Ukraine international footballers
Association football goalkeepers
FC Dynamo Kyiv players
FC Dynamo-2 Kyiv players
FC Dynamo-3 Kyiv players
FC CSKA Kyiv players
Ukrainian Premier League players
Ukrainian First League players
Ukrainian Second League players
Ukrainian Amateur Football Championship players
2006 FIFA World Cup players
Ukrainian football managers
Ukrainian Democratic Alliance for Reform politicians